Nina Pegova (born 5 January 1994) is a Russian professional golfer.

Career
Pegova won the Russian Open Amateur Championship three times and was runner-up in the Finnish Amateur and Hungarian Amateur Championships. She has also won the Russian Open Professional Championship.

Pegova turned professional in 2015 and joined the LET Access Series (LETAS). She lost a playoff to Linda Henriksson of Finland at the 2017 VP Bank Ladies Open in Switzerland. In 2018, she finished T7 at the Jabra Ladies Open, a dual-ranking event with the Ladies European Tour.

Pegova won her first LETAS title at the 2019 Ladies Finnish Open and finished ninth on the Order of Merit. In 2020, she played in her first LPGA Tour event, the Women's Australian Open at Royal Adelaide Golf Club, where she did not make the cut.

In 2021, Pegova was runner-up at the Czech Ladies Challenge, Golf Flanders LETAS Trophy and Santander Golf Tour Zaragoza, before winning the Flumserberg Ladies Open in Switzerland.

Professional wins (2)

LET Access Series wins (2)

References

External links

Russian female golfers
Sportspeople from Chelyabinsk Oblast
1994 births
Living people